Amphia sogai is a moth of the family Noctuidae first described by Pierre Viette in 1967. It is found in northern Madagascar.

Its wingspan ranges from 42 to 46 mm, with a length of the forewings of 21 to 23 mm. This species is close to Amphia gigantea Viette, 1958.

References

Moths described in 1967
Amphia
Moths of Madagascar
Moths of Africa